Geoff Fletcher (c. 1943 – November 2017) was a professional rugby league footballer, coach and chairman. Fletcher in his younger years played for Thatto Heath and later with Pilkington Recs where he played as a back and also as a winger. He later turned professional with Leigh. Geoff Fletcher also had stints with Oldham, Wigan and Workington Town. He joined Huyton in 1978 and went on to become player / coach and later manager. He died in November 2017, aged 74.

Playing career

County Cup Final appearances
Fletcher played right-, i.e. number 10, in Oldham's 13–16 defeat by Wigan in the 1966 Lancashire County Cup Final during the 1966–67 season at Station Road, Swinton on Saturday 29 October 1966, played left- (replaced by interchange/substitute Dennis Maders) in the 2–30 defeat by St. Helens in the 1968 Lancashire County Cup Final during the 1968–69 season at Central Park, Wigan on Friday 25 October 1968, and played left-, and scored in Wigan's 15–8 victory over Widnes in the 1971 Lancashire County Cup Final during the 1971–72 season at Knowsley Road, St. Helens on Saturday 28 August 1971.

Coaching career and chairmanship
Fletcher joined Huyton as player-coach in August 1977. He stayed on as coach after his playing career was over and eventually became the club's chairman. Fletcher remained involved with the club until its demise as Prescot Panthers in 1997.

Personal life
In addition to his rugby career, Fletcher owned a pig farm situated close to St Helens former ground, Knowsley Road. He was the son of the rugby league footballer who played in the 1930s for St Helens R.F.C.; Bill Fletcher.

References

External links
 Once in a Lifetime: Another Bloody Sunday at Yorkshire Film Archive, featuring Fletcher as player-coach at Huyton in 1980

1940s births
2017 deaths
English rugby league coaches
English rugby league players
Leigh Leopards players
Liverpool City coaches
Liverpool City (rugby league) players
Oldham R.L.F.C. players
Rugby articles needing expert attention
Rugby league props
Wigan Warriors players
Workington Town players